Colin Falconer (born 1953) is a pen name of Colin Bowles, who also uses the pen name Mark D'Abranville, an English-born Australian writer.  Works published under the pen name include contemporary and historical thrillers, and children's books.  Under his original name he has also published books of satirical fiction; non-fiction books about language; television and radio scripts; and many magazine articles and columns.

Biography
Born in North London, Bowles moved to Australia in his twenties and worked as a taxi driver and guitarist before joining an advertising agency. In 1984 he moved to Sydney to pursue a career as a writer.

He worked as a freelance journalist for various major magazines and wrote scripts for radio and television before becoming a full-time novelist in 1990. His books have been translated into 17 languages. He lived for many years near Dunsborough, Western Australia, where he and his late wife, Helen, raised two daughters. While writing, he also worked for many years in the volunteer ambulance service.

Awards

Novels by Colin Falconer
Falconer novels have an international audience. Harem (also published as The Sultan's Harem), the story of Suleiman the Magnificent, sold over 150,000 copies in Germany alone.

Harem (1993)
Aztec (1999)
Feathered Serpent (2002)
The Sultan's Harem (2004)
Silk Road (2011)
Anastasia (2012)
 Isabella: Braveheart of France (2013)
 East India (2014)
 Nights in the Sun
 Venom
Deathwatch (1991)
Fury
Opium
Triad
Dangerous
Disappeared
Rough Justice
The Certainty of Doing Evil
When We Were Gods
My Beautiful Spy
Pearls
Stairway to the Moon (sequel to Pearls)
Surfing Mr. Petrovic
Colossus
 Stigmata
 The Unkillable Kitty O'Kane (2017)
 Lord of the Atlas (2022)

Works by Colin Bowles
These include:
 Wit's Dictionary
 G'day, Teach Yourself Australian
 The Year We Seized the Day (2007, with Elizabeth Best)
"Flying Blind"
"Flying Hazzard"

References

External links

 Official Website

20th-century Australian novelists
20th-century Australian male writers
21st-century Australian novelists
Australian male novelists
English emigrants to Australia
Australian taxi drivers
1953 births
Living people
21st-century Australian male writers